Edward Lawson Birnie (25 August 1878 in Sunderland – 21 December 1935) was a professional footballer and manager. He played for Sunderland Seaburn, Newcastle United, Crystal Palace, Chelsea and Tottenham Hotspur In his managerial career, he took on the reins at Southend United, staying in charge of the seaside club until his retirement in 1934.

Playing career 

Birnie began his career at local club Sunderland Seaburn before joining Newcastle United. The commanding centre half played in 19 matches between 1898–1903. Birnie went on to play for Crystal Palace where he featured in 29 matches in all competitions (22 league). In August 1906 he joined Chelsea, making his debut on 8 September 1906 in a 0–0 draw away at Blackpool. Birnie participated in 108 games in all competitions and scored on three occasions for the Stamford Bridge club. After Chelsea decided against renewing his contract, Tottenham Hotspur signed him in 1910, playing in four matches and scoring a single goal at White Hart Lane.

Coaching and management career 

After his playing career had ended, Birnie joined German club FC Mülheim as a coach. He then had spells as a trainer at Sunderland and Rochdale. In 1922 he became manager of Southend United and spent 12 seasons in charge of the club, becoming the only manager to preside over a Southend team for more than 500 matches (April 2009). Birnie retired in May 1934, but would be beset with ill-health and died in December 1935 aged 57.

Managerial statistics

References 

 

1878 births
1935 deaths
Footballers from Sunderland
Sportspeople from Essex
English footballers
English Football League players
Southern Football League players
Newcastle United F.C. players
Crystal Palace F.C. players
Chelsea F.C. players
Tottenham Hotspur F.C. players
Southend United F.C. managers
Association football central defenders
English football managers